Callidiellum is a genus of beetles in the family Cerambycidae, containing the following species:

 Callidiellum cupressi (Van Dyke, 1923)
 Callidiellum virescens Chemsak & Linsley, 1966

References

Callidiini
Cerambycidae genera